The 2018 1. divisjon was the second tier of Norwegian women's football in 2018. The season kicked off on 14 April 2018, finishing on 3 November 2018.

The top placed team was promoted to next year's Toppserien. The second placed team contested a playoff against the 11th placed team from the 2018 Toppserien for the right to play in Toppserien next season.

Table
1. Fart – Promoted
2. Grei 
3. Byåsen 
4. Øvrevoll Hosle 
5. Medkila 
6. Amazon Grimstad 
7. Fløya 
8. Åsane 
9. Kaupanger 
10. Nanset 
11. Urædd – Relegated
12. Bossekop – Relegated

References

External links
Fotball.no

2018
2
Norway
Norway